The Aarhus Runestones or Ålum Runestones are six Viking Age runestones which were discovered in and around the city of Aarhus, Denmark. The stones are officially titled Aarhus 1 through 6 and they are all memorial stones created in memory or honor of a person. All six stones are kept and displayed at Moesgård Museum and one of the stones is known as the Aarhus Stone or Mask Stone and features the carving of a mask which has become the official symbol of Moesgård Museum.

DR 63
DR 63 also known as Aarhus Stone 1 is from  970–1020 and has been known since Ole Worm's time in Aarhus when it was used as building material in a wall of the cloister connecting the Church of Our Lady to the priory. Traces of mortar and the carving of the stone suggests it has been used in other structures prior to being placed in the Church of Our Lady. At some point it disappeared from the church but was found in the harbor bulwark in 1866. The stone is of granite and measures  although it has been cut to fit as construction material resulting in the upper and lower parts of the inscription missing.

Thexle is a type of axe, here used as an epithet.

DR 65
DR 65 also known as Aarhus Stone 2, Aarhus 3 or Aarhus IV,  is dated to  970–1020. It was found as part of a staircase during a renovation of Aarhus Cathedral School in 1847. The stone has been carved a number of times suggesting it has been used a building material on more than one occasion. The stone is of granite and measures  although it has been cut to fit as construction material resulting in the upper and right side resulting in parts of the inscription missing.

It is uncertain if the stone was made by Bjørn, son of Asger, or if it was made in his memory.

DR 66

DR 66, also known as Aarhus Stone 3, Aarhus 4 or Aarhus II, is dated to  970–1020. It was found in 1850 in the foundation of a water mill that had burned down where it had been used as a cornerstone. The stone contains an inscription and the carving of a  mask in mammen style. The inscription is placed on two of the sides and above the mask. The front of the stone is somewhat weathered making some of the inscription unclear.

It is possible that "when kings fought" refers to the Battle of Svolder

DR 67
DR 67, also known as Aarhus Stone 4, also known as Aarhus III or Aarhus 5, is dated to  970–1020. It was found in 1866 in the foundation of the Church of Our Lady in Aarhus.

DR 68
DR 68, also known as Aarhus Stone 5, Aarhus 6 and Aarhus V, is from  970–1020 and was found in the foundation of the Church of Our Lady in Aarhus during a restoration in 1905. The stone has an inscription with ornamental spirals finishing the bottom lines on both sides combined with vegetative curls on the b side.

The inscription is finished with a small cross.

Aarhus Stone 6
Aarhus Stone 6, also known as Aarhus 6 and Aarhus V, is from  970–1020 and was found under the foundation of the Church of Our Lady in Aarhus during a restoration in 1958. 
The stone has an inscription which is too fragmented to be deciphered.

References

Runestones in Denmark